Super Capers: The Origins of Ed and the Missing Bullion is a 2009 American superhero comedy film and a parody of superhero films, written and directed by Ray Griggs, and starring Justin Whalin, Michael Rooker, Ryan McPartlin, Samuel Lloyd, Danielle Harris, Ray Griggs, Christine Lakin, Jon Polito, Adam West, June Lockhart, Doug Jones, Clint Howard, and Tom Sizemore. It tells the story about an aspiring superhero who is assigned to a halfway house for superheroes with powers that haven't been developed as they fight the local criminals.

Story
The story begins with a beautiful girl (Christine Lakin) in a red outfit being followed through a dark alleyway by a mysterious man (Clint Howard) who clearly has criminal intent. As she corners herself in a dead end, Ed Gruberman (Justin Whalin) arrives to save the day. The woman, calling herself simply "Red" reveals to both of the men that she has superpowers, disabling the robber whom Ed strikes with a 2x4, sending him through the window of a law office. Red kisses Gruberman passionately before disappearing into the night, and he is left standing as the police come to arrest him.

In court, Gruberman is standing trial for viciously attacking an "innocent bystander" with the mugger being defended by a lawyer named Roger Cheatem (Tom Sizemore). The case is flattened by the judge (Michael Rooker) who takes sympathy to Gruberman's story of how his parents were killed after an accident at their circus wound up with them being killed by a short bus. In particular his fascination and respect for the television superhero the Dark Winged Vesper, with whom Ed shares his orphaning (and lack of powers unbeknownst to the court). Ed is fined $1 for the payment to Roger's window and sentenced to a halfway house to superheroes whose powers still have not yet been developed.

Ed is taken there by a cab driver (Adam West) who proclaims he too was a superhero once, named the Manbat. When he arrives, he meets Sarge (Tommy Lister) who is the Capers' human liaison and other superheroes Puffer Boy (Ray Griggs), Herman Brainard (Sam Lloyd), Will Powers (Ryan McPartlin), and Felicia Freeze (Danielle Harris) with whom Ed develops an immediate attraction to. Along with the unimaginative Herbert "Q" who has a robot similar to a tiny version of the Terminator whose primary invention was an RV fashioned after the DeLorean time machine from the Back to the Future films, complete with a flux capacitor, which they cannot tell actually works because the RV cannot get up to 88 miles per hour.

The group is called out on a mission to stop the supervillain Captain Sludge (Jon Polito) and his Minotaur minion Cretan (Bobby "Slim" Jones) who are robbing an armored car. In a show of panic, Gruberman prays for help. Thinking he has the power of "Prayer", Will sends him out to fight and he supposedly forces a lamppost to fall onto Cretan, allowing the heroes to be victorious and earning Felicia's eye. However, Gruberman's world begins to fall apart when he and Brainard attempt to follow the suspicious Judge incognito when he is picked up by his chauffeur (Taylor Negron). Ed is set up for stealing millions in Gold Bullion and sending them to a Swiss Bank account, which the number was found conveniently in his pocket.

Gruberman is taken by the Special Agents Smith (Doug Jones and Isaac C. Singleton Jr.) to visit the Judge. Red makes an appearance who reveals that the Judge is the Dark Winged Vesper and that she works for him. The Judge reveals himself to be Gruberman's father AND, and that the stunt that killed his parents was orchestrated by him (but not intended to be fatal). He attempts to lure Gruberman to the dark side (a'la Return of the Jedi).

Gruberman manages to escape. In an ensuing chase with Sludge, he drives the RV off the Mount Rushmore national monument. When telling God that he will soon be with him, the vehicle reaches 88 miles per hour, sending him back to the date of his first mission 1 week prior (as Will Powers had put the date into the time circuits to mark the event). He travels to the bridge and learns that should he encounter his past self (before that he saw the judge and imitates the voice of Vito Corleone and the catchphrase "it was not personal, it was only business"), one of them would spontaneously combust.

He manages to meet the Super Capers, and in the process of revealing the Judge's plans encounters his younger self. After giving away the events to follow in the week ahead, the Judge is immobilized by Freeze, Sludge and Cretan surrender, and Red is defeated by Freeze who admits her attraction to Gruberman. The confusion of two Grubermans is resolved when the past version combusts, leaving only the one from the future and the day appears to be saved. After noticing that the Judge escaped leaving his dropped pants behind, Gruberman and the Super Capers then drive off in their RV.

In a post-credits scene, the Judge has met with his chauffeur and the Special Agents Smith stating that Gruberman has proved that God exists. The Special Agents Smith plan to unleash their powers as their eyes glow green. The words "To be continued" then appear on the screen.

Cast

Reception

References

External links
 
 
 

2009 films
2009 action comedy films
Films shot in California
American superhero films
Film superheroes
2000s superhero comedy films
Roadside Attractions films
American independent films
2009 independent films
2000s parody films
2009 comedy films
2000s English-language films
2000s American films